Nawton is a community suburb in western Hamilton in New Zealand.

Features 
Within Nawton are Playworx Kindy, an Anglican church, the Yardhouse bar, and the Sugar Bowl café

Demographics

Nawton had a population of 7,875 at the 2018 New Zealand census, an increase of 396 people (5.3%) since the 2013 census, and an increase of 609 people (8.4%) since the 2006 census. There were 2,604 households, comprising 3,732 males and 4,143 females, giving a sex ratio of 0.9 males per female, with 1,887 people (24.0%) aged under 15 years, 1,893 (24.0%) aged 15 to 29, 3,189 (40.5%) aged 30 to 64, and 906 (11.5%) aged 65 or older.

Ethnicities were 60.9% European/Pākehā, 34.2% Māori, 8.6% Pacific peoples, 14.0% Asian, and 2.4% other ethnicities. People may identify with more than one ethnicity.

The percentage of people born overseas was 18.2, compared with 27.1% nationally.

Although some people chose not to answer the census's question about religious affiliation, 47.5% had no religion, 32.2% were Christian, 2.5% had Māori religious beliefs, 3.7% were Hindu, 1.9% were Muslim, 1.7% were Buddhist and 3.6% had other religions.

Of those at least 15 years old, 846 (14.1%) people had a bachelor's or higher degree, and 1,449 (24.2%) people had no formal qualifications. 561 people (9.4%) earned over $70,000 compared to 17.2% nationally. The employment status of those at least 15 was that 2,997 (50.1%) people were employed full-time, 729 (12.2%) were part-time, and 387 (6.5%) were unemployed.

Community Centres and schools 
There are at least two community centres in Nawton. These include the Western Community Centre and the Good News Community Centre, which opened in 2014. 

The school opened in 1960.

Fraser High School is a secondary state school for year 9 to 13 students. The school was established in 1920 and called Hamilton Manual Training Centre. It moved to what is now the site of Waikato Institute of Technology and became Hamilton Technical College in 1924, then moved to its current site in 1970 and was renamed to Fraser High School after a previous principal.

Both these schools are coeducational. Rolls are as of

History 
A community constable was removed from the area in 2014. Neil Tolan (a Hamilton community advocate) believed that the loss of community constables would have a radical impact on neighbourhoods and lead to unreported crimes. In 2014, it was found that a number of the suburb's homes were sinking. This meant that flooding and large-scale damage was caused. In April 2016, Nawton was found to be the Hamilton's worst suburb for dog attacks. In December of that year, Hamilton mayor Andrew King opened a million dollar playground at Dominion Park as part of the city council's Playgrounds of the Future plan. The playground (known as Te oko o Kirikiriroa) became one of seven destination playgrounds in the city. In 2017, a petition called for a return of devoted community police officers. The petition was co-organized by Labour MP Sue Moroney, Western Community Centre manager Neil Tolan and city councillor James Casson at that year's Waitangi Day celebrations.

See also
List of streets in Hamilton
Suburbs of Hamilton, New Zealand

References

External links 
Western Community Centre Official Website
photo of Nawton Hall in 1970s

Suburbs of Hamilton, New Zealand